The Chalice of Sorrow is a 1916 American silent film drama written and directed by Rex Ingram and starring Cleo Madison. It was produced by the Bluebird Photoplays subsidiary of Universal Film Manufacturing Company.

The film was called The Chalice of Remorse in the UK.

Cast
Cleo Madison as Lorelei
Blanche White as Isabel Clifford
Charles Cummings as Marion Leslie
John McDermott as Rance Clifford
Wedgwood Nowell as Francisco De Sarpina
Howard Crampton as Siestra
Albert MacQuarrie as Pietro
Rhea Haines as Pietro's Wife

unbilled
John George as Mexican
Jack Holt

Preservation status
The film is preserved in the UCLA Film & Television archive and Filmarchiv Austria, Wien.

References

External links

1916 films
American silent feature films
Films directed by Rex Ingram
American films based on plays
Films based on La Tosca
American black-and-white films
Silent American drama films
1916 drama films
1910s American films